Virtual group  may refer to:
 Virtual band in music
 Groupoid in category theory (an area of mathematics)